Pély is a village in Heves County, Hungary.

Notable residents
Zsuzsa Körmöczy (1924–2006), World No. 2 women's tennis player
Mari Törőcsik, actress

References

Populated places in Heves County